Yuvarlakia, or giouvarlakia (from , 'round'), is a Greek dish consisting of balls of ground meat, rice, and seasonings, cooked in a pot, in water or meat broth. The mixture is similar to that used for making sarma. They may be served in tomato or avgolemono sauce. Depending on the thickness of the sauce, it may be considered a soup or a stew.

A similar dish in Turkish cuisine is terbiyeli köfte.

See also
 List of meatball dishes

References

External links
 Recipe

Greek soups
Greek stews
Meatballs
Egg-based sauces